The following lists events that happened during 1913 in South Africa.

Incumbents
 Monarch: King George V.
 Governor-General and High Commissioner for Southern Africa: The Viscount Gladstone.
 Prime Minister: Louis Botha.
 Chief Justice: John de Villiers, 1st Baron de Villiers

Events
May
 South Africa's first flying school opens in Kimberley to train pilots for the South African Aviation Corps.

June
 19 – The Natives Land Act is passed, limiting land ownership for blacks to black territories.

November
 6 – Mohandas Gandhi is arrested while leading a march of Indian miners in South Africa.

Unknown date
 The City of Greater Cape Town is formed by the union of Central Cape Town, Green Point and Sea Point, Woodstock, Maitland, Mowbray, Rondebosch, Claremont and Kalk Bay.

Births
 6 April – A. P. Mda, co-founder of the African National Congress Youth League (ANCYL) and Pan Africanist Congress of Azania (d. 1993)
 9 December – Gerard Sekoto, artist. (d. 1993)

Deaths
 12 March – Christoffel Cornelis Froneman, commandant of the Orange Free State and founder of Marquard. (b. 1846)
 30 April – Daniël Jacobus Erasmus, acting state president of the Zuid-Afrikaansche Republiek. (b. 1830)
 16 November – Abraham Fischer, Prime Minister of the Orange River Colony. (b. 1850)

Railways

Railway lines opened

 5 March – Cape – Vredenburg to Saldanha (Narrow gauge), .
 15 May – Free State – Arlington to Senekal, .
 15 July – Cape – Butterworth to Idutywa, .
 6 August – Cape – George to Oudtshoorn, .
 3 November – Cape – Graafwater to Kleipan, .
 3 November – Free State – Reitz to Marsala, .
 10 November – Transvaal – Nelspruit to Sabie, .
 1 December – Natal – Greytown to Ahrens, .
 5 December – Transvaal – Bandelierkop to Lilliput, .
 15 December – Natal – Tendeka to Piet Retief (Transvaal), .

Locomotives
 Two new Cape gauge locomotive types enter service on the South African Railways (SAR):
 The first of ten Class 4A 4-8-2 Mountain type steam locomotives.
 The first of 45 Class 14 4-8-2 Mountain type locomotives.
 The New Cape Central Railway places three Cape 7th Class  Mastodon type locomotives in service.

Sports

Rugby
 11 January – The South African Springboks beat the French Les Tricolores 38–5 in Bordeaux, France.

References

South Africa
Years in South Africa
History of South Africa